Pietro Arcidiacono (born 21 May 1988) is an Italian football player. He plays for Giarre.

Club career
He made his Serie B debut for Empoli on 30 August 2008 in a game against Brescia.

On 15 September 2018, he joined Serie D club Messina.

On 17 January 2020, his contract with Potenza was terminated by mutual consent. The next day, he returned to ACR Messina.

On 30 July 2021, he moved to Giarre in Serie D.

Controversies
In November 2012 Arcidiacono, while playing for Cosenza, celebrated a goal displaying a shirt with "Speziale Innocente" written on it. This was because Arcidiacono is a childhood friend of Antonino Speziale, the young Catania supporter convicted of the murder of Filippo Raciti in the Catania incidents in 2007.

Following this episode, viewed as offensive for the memory of the late Raciti and of his family, Arcidiacono was given a DASPO, a football banning order, by the Police Director (Questore) of Catanzaro. This banning order, whilst impeding him to enter any football stadium in Italy, did not impact his career as a professional footballer.

References

External links
 

1988 births
Footballers from Catania
Footballers from Sicily
Living people
Italian footballers
Association football forwards
Italy youth international footballers
Empoli F.C. players
A.C. Monza players
A.S.D. Sorrento players
S.S. Fidelis Andria 1928 players
Cosenza Calcio players
A.S. Martina Franca 1947 players
S.S. Juve Stabia players
Calcio Foggia 1920 players
S.S. Arezzo players
A.S.D. Sicula Leonzio players
A.C.R. Messina players
F.C. Vado players
Potenza Calcio players
A.S.D. Giarre Calcio 1946 players
Serie B players
Serie C players
Serie D players